A burn pit is an area of a United States military base in which waste is disposed of by burning.

According to the United States Army field manual, there are four other ways outside of burn pits to dispose of nonhazardous solid waste: incinerators, burial, landfills, and tactical burial. Open-air burning is a way to dispose of waste, but increases risk of fire and produces noxious fumes. Due to modern waste in deployed environments, there is plastic (including water bottles), shipping materials, electronic waste, and other material that may emit toxic aerial compounds. Burn pits were heavily criticized and resulted in lawsuits by veterans, Department of Defense civilians, and military contractors. Global environmental consciousness has especially criticized these instances of large-scale burn pit operation. The effects of burn pits seem to be similar to that of fire debris cleanup.

The Department of Defense estimates 3.5 million exposed service members. The Department of Veterans Affairs has denied about 75% of veterans’ burn pit claims.

Use in Iraq and Afghanistan
The phrase "burn pit" gained notoriety in the 21st century, especially in U.S. military sites in Iraq and Afghanistan. However, this practice was used well before the War on Terror (2001 to present).

During the Iraq and Afghanistan wars starting in 2001, military bases throughout the region used burn pits as a way to dispose of waste. These locations included Iraq, Afghanistan, Kuwait, Saudi Arabia, Bahrain, Djibouti, Diego Garcia, Gulf of Aden, Gulf of Oman, Oman, Qatar, United Arab Emirates, Persian Gulf, Arabian Sea, and Red Sea. In 2010, large-scale burn pit operations in Iraq and Afghanistan, allegedly operated by the U.S. military or its contractors such as KBR, were reported to have allowed the operation of the burn pits for long periods, burning many tons of assorted waste. Active duty personnel reported respiratory difficulties and headaches in some cases, while some veterans made disability claims based on respiratory system symptoms allegedly derived from the burn pits. General David Petraeus, commander, US Central Command and Multi-National Force-Iraq, stated commanders' concerns were about basic needs (food and water) of the soldiers under his command and not burn pits, at the time. The Special Inspector General for Afghanistan Reconstruction found burn pits to be indefensible because their emissions are potentially harmful to US servicemembers.

Examples

Joint Base Balad (JBB), the largest U.S. base in Iraq had a burn pit operation as late as the summer of 2008, burning 147 tons of waste per day when the Army Times published a major story about it and related health concerns. An Air Force spokesman speaking for the 609th Combined Air and Space Operations Center Southwest Asia vigorously contested allegations of health effects and emphasized mitigation efforts. In Afghanistan, at its peak, more than 400 tons of waste was disposed using burn pits daily.

According to Leon Russell Keith, a military contractor stationed at Balad who testified at a Senate hearing in 2009, ash was everywhere, including on beds and clothes. He described that the thick black smoke was present even in the barracks, where it permanently stained sheets. One soldier described the smoke as “like San Francisco fog.” Another called it “pollen dust.” The color of the smoke could be blue and black, or yellow and orange, but was usually black.

Duration
Burn pits were allegedly adopted as a temporary measure but remained in use several years after alternative methods of disposal such as incineration were available. Burn pits were used during Operation Desert Shield and Desert Storm. As of July 2019, there were still nine sanctioned burn pits in operations in Syria, Afghanistan and Egypt. Per the DoD, this is a last resort when no feasible alternative exists. For longer term enduring locations, conventional solid waste practices are used.

Use in the United States 
Hazardous materials are burned in open piles at military installations in the United States, including the Radford Army Ammunition Plant in Virginia.

Materials burned and combustion products 
The waste burned using burn pits included chemicals, paints, medical waste, human waste, metal and aluminum products, electronic waste, munitions (including unexploded ordnance), petroleum products, lubricants, plastics, rubber, wood, and food waste. A typical burn pit uses jet fuel (usually JP-8) as the accelerant. The burning of such material created clouds of black smoke.

According to an Air Force fact sheet, "Burning solid wastes in an open pit generates numerous pollutants. These pollutants include dioxins, particulate matter, polycyclic aromatic hydrocarbons, volatile organic compounds, carbon monoxide, hexachlorobenzene, and ash. Highly toxic dioxins, produced in small amounts in almost all burning processes, can be produced in elevated levels with increased combustion of plastic waste (such as discarded drinking water bottles) and if the combustion is not at high incinerator temperatures. Inefficient combustion of medical or latrine wastes can emit disease-laden aerosols." Hexachlorodibenzo-p-dioxin (colloquially known as dioxin) is the same chemical found in Agent Orange used in the Vietnam War. Additionally, burn pits also created particulate matter (PM) 2.5 and PM 10 pollution. Below is a table that has all of the known pollutants that were discovered in burn pits.

Health effects
In 2009, growing concerns regarding the health effects of burn pits led President Barack Obama to direct federal agencies to consult recent scientific findings regarding burn pits to protect US military personnel, and for military commanders to implement recommendations to protect those under their command. Anthony Szema, MD of Stony Brook School of Medicine stated that humans exposed to air pollution, especially particulate matter (PM), have high risk of death and lung disease (e.g. Chronic obstructive pulmonary disease). Benzene (a component of JP-8) is a known carcinogen and was a commonly used accelerant for burn pits. Burn pits operate at lower temperatures which causes more incomplete combustion, which results in greater amounts of aerosolized toxic by-products.

In November 2009, the Veteran's Administration (VA) and the National Academy of Sciences Institute of Medicine (IOM) began an 18-month study to determine the long-term health effects of exposure to the burn pits in Iraq and Afghanistan. The VA and the Department of Defense (DoD), the Board on the Health of Select Populations of the Institute of Medicine formed the Committee on Long-term Health Consequences of Exposure to Burn Pits in Iraq and Afghanistan which held its first meeting February 23/24, 2010 in Washington, D.C. In 2011, the Institute of Medicine reviewed the scientific literature related to the possibility of adverse long-term health effects of open burn pits. The report, Long-Term Health Consequences of Exposure to Burn Pits in Iraq and Afghanistan noted U.S. Department of Defense air quality monitoring data measured levels of particulate matter (PM) higher than generally considered safe by U.S. regulatory agencies. It also cited work linking high PM levels to cardiopulmonary effects, particularly in individuals at increased risk due to pre-existing conditions such as asthma and emphysema. They concluded that there is only limited evidence suggestive "of an association between exposure to combustion products and reduced pulmonary function in these populations." If there is sufficient evidence of a connection between exposure to burn pits and subsequent illness and disability, it might serve as the basis for congressional enactment of a "presumption of service connection" similar to that in place for exposure to Agent Orange.

Currently, there has been research in the following areas to determine exposure to burn pit and health effects:

 Reproductive Health Outcomes: There is some research to suggest that toxins from burn pits can have adverse birth outcomes (low birth weight, preterm delivery, and increased risk of birth defects). Additionally, there is growing evidence to suggest a reduction in sperm quality associated with burn pits.
 Autoimmune Disorders A study found no elevated occurrence of rheumatoid arthritis and lupus among veterans deployed within 3 miles of burn pits.
 Cancers: It is believed one veteran's fatal pancreatic cancer is associated with burn pit exposure. Another veteran is believed to have brain cancer from the exposure. One study using Burn Pits 360's registry, there is a higher rate of proportionate cancer mortality among deceased veterans.
 High Blood Pressure: A study from the Veterans Affairs Airborne Hazards and Open Burn Pit Registry, one-third those exposed to burn pits were diagnosed with high blood pressure.
 Respiratory Disorders: The Veterans Affairs Airborne Hazards and Open Burn Pit Registry, 30% of participates have been diagnosed with chronic obstructive pulmonary disease, emphysema, and chronic bronchitis.
But according to the Army, proper waste management practices have reduced the spread of infectious diseases that contributed significantly to mortality and morbidity in military populations.

Veterans Affairs Registry 
The Veterans Affairs Airborne Hazards and Open Burn Pit Registry established in 2014 of to gather information about veterans and service members collected through a question regarding exposure to burn pits air. Operation Enduring Freedom/Operation Iraqi Freedom/Operation New Dawn or 1990-1991 Gulf War veterans and service members can use the registry questionnaire to report exposures to airborne hazards (such as smoke from burn pits, oil-well fires, or pollution during deployment), as well as other exposures and health concerns.

Reports on the registry data:

1. Report on Data from the Airborne Hazards and Open Burn Pit (AH&OBP) Registry, June 2015 - Between April 25, 2014, and December 31, 2014, nearly thirty thousand Veterans and Active Duty Servicemembers filled out the registry survey. This report highlights health conditions and physical limitations experienced by burn pit registry participants.
The most common doctor-diagnosed health problems reported were insomnia and neurological problems.
Other commonly diagnosed health problems reported include allergies, high blood pressure, and lung disease like emphysema, chronic bronchitis, and asthma.
It is important to remember that Registry findings alone can't tell if exposure to burn pits, dust storms, or other hazards caused these health conditions.
2. Report on Data from the Airborne Hazards and Open Burn Pit (AH&OBP) Registry, April 2015

As of December 31, 2019, 186,051 veterans and active duty members have completed the questionnaire since June 2014.

Proposed health tracking
US Army veteran and University of Pennsylvania graduate student Chad Baer has vocally asserted that claims of inclusive results are due to faulty research design. Baer was selected as a SVA/VFW Legislative Fellow in 2019, and traveled to Capitol Hill to advocate for a predictive analytics model. Baer has asserted that technological advances have made longitudinal studies of all veterans feasible, except that this is not possible so long as the Department of Defense refuses to give VA researchers more complete data. The data in question would be the personnel data that would allow the VA to establish "clusters", based on items such as physical location, job specialties, or other relevant data points.

Legislative response 
A Minnesota mother, Amie Muller, was a victim of the exposure and her senator, Amy Klobuchar (MN-DFL), carried a bill called the “Helping Vets Exposed to Burn Pits Act” that was passed and signed into law by President Donald Trump (as H.R. 5895) on September 21, 2018. Through 2019, it will provide $5 million for burn pit research, education and evaluation of the exposure of other U.S. service members and veterans to burn pits and toxic airborne chemicals.

Congressional action taken includes:
2009 – HR 2419, Military Personnel War Zone Toxic Exposure Prevention Act
2013 – President Obama signed the National Burn Pit Registry into law as part of the Dignified Burial and Veterans' Benefit Improvement Act of 2012.
2018 – President Trump signed the Helping Vets Exposed to Burn Pits Act.
2022 – President Biden signed the Promise to Address Comprehensive Toxics (PACT) Act

See also 
Combustion
Incineration
Waste Incineration Directive
Waste management

References

Further reading 
Department of Veterans Affairs, Public Health, VA's Airborne Hazards and Open Burn Pit Registry webpage
VA Airborne Hazards and Open Burn Pit Registry Video
"Report: Army making toxic mess in war zones" article by Kelly Kennedy in Military Times Oct 3, 2008
David E. Mosher, Beth E. Lachman, Michael D. Greenberg, Tiffany Nichols, Brian Rosen, Henry H. Willis, Green Warriors: Army Environmental Considerations for Contingency Operations from Planning through Post-Conflict, Rand Corporation (2008), trade paperback, 252 pages, 
About Green Warriors on Rand website
Environmental Health Surveillance Registries (EHSR) website - U.S. Department of Defense (DoD) information page for VA Burn Pit Registry
Military Burn Pits: the New Agent Orange? by Mary Anne Mercer et al., Huffington Post. burn pits
Red Fridays - Burn Pits, the new Agent Orange
American Public Health Association policy statement, 2015: "Cleanup of U.S. Military Burn Pits in Iraq and Afghanistan" Cleanup of U.S. Military Burn Pits in Iraq and Afghanistan
Al-Jazeera interview with U.S. veteran and experts (1 August 2017): 

Air pollution
Incineration
Industrial hygiene
Military slang and jargon
Risk management
Safety engineering
Veterans' affairs in the United States
Gulf War syndrome
Occupational safety and health